Rudice may refer to places:

Rudice (Blansko District), a municipality and village in the Czech Republic
Rudice (Uherské Hradiště District), a municipality and village in the Czech Republic
Rudice, Bosnia and Herzegovina, a village in Bosnia and Herzegovina